Amen: The Awakening was a first-person shooter developed by Cavedog Entertainment. It was to be the first FPS by Cavedog.   60% completed, it was cancelled in 2000 for a variety of reasons, one of which being that its overall scope and proprietary game engine was far too ambitious, given computer hardware of the time.

Story 
On Christmas Eve 2032, "The Awakening" happens. Over 4 billion humans go on a murderous rampage. In the ensuring chaos, planes crash, cities burn and millions are dead. In order to stop the rampage of the "Afflicted" the European Resistance Organization is formed in Western Europe to create a "Safe-Zone" where those who are not contaminated with the disease can live in harmony.

See also 
Consortium (video game) - Spiritual successor to Amen: The Awakening.

References

External links 
TA Universe's Amen: The Awakening Page

First-person shooters
Cancelled Windows games
Cavedog Entertainment games
Multiplayer and single-player video games
Video games scored by Jeremy Soule
Video games set in the 2030s